

Arts and entertainment
 Manueline, an art style of the early 16th century
 Neo-Manueline, a revival art style from the mid-19th century
 Soft Portuguese style, is an architectural model adopted mainly by public buildings
 Pombaline style, an architectural style of the 18th century
 Portuguese colonial architecture, a collection of styles of architecture that the Portuguese built across the Portuguese Empire
 Visigothic art and architecture, architecture and art styles of the Iberian Visigoths in the 5th century
 Azulejo, a form of painted tin-glazed ceramic tilework
 Portuguese pavement, a traditional-style pavement used in pedestrian areas
 Adufe, a square tambourine
 Ukulele, string instrumental developed by Portuguese immigrants in Hawaii
 Gaita transmontana, a type of Portuguese bagpipe
 Galician gaita, a type of Portuguese and Galician bagpipe.
 Portuguese guitar, a plucked string instrument with twelve steel strings
 Rabeca chuleira, a three-string fiddle
 Cavaquinho, a small string instrument that originated the Ukulele
 Machete, a small string instrument from Madeira
 Viola braguesa, a ten-string instrument
 Viola campaniça, a ten steel string guitar
 Viola amarantina, a ten string guitar with two heart-shaped frontal openings
 Viola toeira, a twelve string guitar

Food and cooking
 Presunto ibérico, a type of cured ham
 Portuguese cuisine
 Enchidos, a variety of cured, dry sausages
 Alheira, a type of sausage made with meats other than pork (usually veal, duck, chicken, quail or rabbit) and bread
 São Jorge cheese, a type of semi-hard to hard cheese
 Castelo Branco cheese, type of goat cheese
 Serra da Estrela cheese, a type of ewes cheese
 Port wine, a type of fortified wine
 Moscatel, a type of fortified wine
 Madeira wine, a type of fortified wine
 Jeropiga, a type of fortified white wine
 Vinho Verde, a type of white wine fermented using young grapes
 Pastel de nata, an egg tart pastry
 Tempura, a Japanese dish introduced to Japan by Portuguese Jesuit missionaries
 Marmalade, a type of fruit preserve
 Churros, a type of fried-dough pastry brought by the Portuguese from China

Nautical science

 Carrack, a three- or four-masted sailing ship
 Caravel, a small, highly maneuverable sailing ship
 Square-rigged caravel, a sailing ship 
 Nonius, a system for taking fine measurements on the astrolabe
 Mariner's astrolabe, an inclinometer used to determine the latitude of a ship
 Portuguese nautical cartography, a compendium of navigational and geographic maps
 Cantino planisphere, the earliest extant nautical chart where places are depicted according to their astronomically observed latitudes
 School of Sagres, first court of navigation founded in Sagres
 Chip log, a navigation tool mariners use to estimate the speed of a vessel through water
 Volta do mar, a navigation technique that exploits trade winds to move across the sea

Weaponry
 Carracks black sword, a type of sword designed to be used by soldiers and sailors in ships and caravels
 Dilagrama m/65, a grenade adapter that fits the barrel of the G3
 FBP submachine gun, a 9 mm submachine gun
 Mauser–Vergueiro, a bolt-action rifle
 Lusa submachine gun, a compact 9×19mm Parabellum submachine gun
 Bravia Chaimite, an armored vehicle with all wheel drive axles
 M1940 helmet, a combat helmet

Science and technology
 Familial amyloidotic neuropathy, a group of autosomal dominant diseases of the nervous system first described by Corino Andrade
 Circulatory system, Amato Lusitano discovered the circulation of the blood and the function of valves 
 Cerebral angiography, developed by António Egas Moniz
 Lobotomy, pioneered by António Egas Moniz
 Tropical medicine, pioneered by Garcia de Orta
 Pyreliophorus, solar oven
 Prepaid Mobile Phone, a mobile phone for which credit is purchased in advance of service use
 Multibanco, an interbank network with a wide range of services that can be utilised through its machines
 All-on-4, a dental technique for total rehabilitation of the edentulous patient
 Via Verde, an electronic toll collection system
 Coloradd, a sign code for aiding colour blind people to recognise colours
 Passarola, a type of lighter-than-air airship, the predecessor of air balloon
 Artificial horizon sextant, an airship device to measure the distance between the horizon line and celestial bodies
 Microphone Windshield
 Electric wheelchair elevator
 Electronic cane for the blind
 Electrovisor, a tactile system for the blind to perceive images
 BASIL, vibratory system for deaf people to perceive sounds
 COPASI, software application for creating and solving mathematical models of biological processes
 Eslicarbazepine acetate, anticonvulsant medication 
 Deaf-mute language, pioneered by Jacob Rodrigues Pereira
 ENER 1000, an early personal computer

Literature
Heteronym, a literary concept in which one or several imaginary character(s) are created by a writer to write in different styles
Ultra-Romanticism, a literary movement derived from the Romanticism that took place in the second half of the 19th century

References

Lists of inventions or discoveries
History of science and technology by country
 
Inventions and discoveries